Chanzab (also Romanized as Chanz̄āb) is a village in Hir Rural District, Hir District, Ardabil County, Ardabil Province, Iran. At the 2006 census, its population was 174, in 40 families.

References 

Towns and villages in Ardabil County